The West Main Street District is a historic district in Kent, Ohio, United States, listed on the National Register of Historic Places.  The district encompasses 25 buildings, most of which are houses, on both sides of West Main Street from its intersection with North and South Mantua Streets on the east to the intersection with North and South Chestnut Streets.  It was listed June 17, 1977.  Included in the district is the Kent Masonic Center, itself listed on the register in 1974, as well as the home of Martin L. Davey, who served as Governor of Ohio from 1935–1939.  Architectural styles represented in the district include Commercial style, Eastlake, Gothic Revival, Greek Revival, Italianate, and Queen Anne style.

See also
History of Kent, Ohio
National Register of Historic Places listings in Portage County, Ohio

References

Historic districts on the National Register of Historic Places in Ohio
History of Kent, Ohio
National Register of Historic Places in Portage County, Ohio